Carl D. Peterson (born May 26, 1943) For more than 50 years, Carl Peterson was a creative force in the world of American Football, starting at the high school level, through small college ball, to major college football, and on to professional football where he enjoyed great success with the Philadelphia Eagles (NFL), Philadelphia Stars (USFL) and the Kansas City Chiefs (NFL.) Peterson stepped on every rung of the football ladder, working as an assistant coach, head coach, administrative assistant, scout, personnel director, general manager, president, chiefs executive officer and owner in his time in the game. He is best known for his 20 years (1989-2008) as president, general manager, and chief executive officer of the Kansas City Chiefs of the National Football League (NFL). 
Since leaving the Chiefs, Peterson has worked in number of related football-areas, serving as Chairman of USA Football, the national governing body for the sport on the amateur level. He's also served on a number of consulting committees for the NFL league office in New York and the Pro Football Hall of Fame in Canton, Ohio. He was also a consultant for FanVision, an in-stadium fan technology device that served numerous NFL teams and Division I universities. It was owned by Miami Dolphins’ owner Stephen Ross. Peterson is also a principle and partner with Dick Vermeil Wines, located in Calistoga, California, with his former head coach. Peterson was among the finalist for consideration in the contributor category for induction into the Pro Football Hall of Fame class of 2023.

Education and early coaching career
Carl Daniel Peterson was born on May 26, 1943, in the Swedish Hospital in Minneapolis, Minnesota. He was the third of four sons born to Louise and Eric Peterson. His father worked heavy construction jobs throughout the Midwest, helping to build various military sites in the throes of World War II. When Carl was not yet four years old, the family moved to Long Beach, California, where Eric began a construction business with his brother-in-law. Carl attended Woodrow Wilson Classical High School in Long Beach, participating in football and baseball for the Wilson Bruins. It was there that the first steps on his future were written with the help of football coach Skip Rowland. Peterson played end, doing more blocking than catching, and also kicked extra points in a straight-on style. He was part of the graduating class of 1961 at Wilson and went on to earn three degrees from the University of California, Los Angeles (UCLA): a bachelor's degree in 1966, a master's degree in 1967, and a doctorate in 1970. His football playing career ended during a practice at UCLA (where he was a walk-on participant), when he suffered three torn knee ligaments. His coaching career began soon afterwards, at his alma mater, where he helped Rowland with the varsity and coached the junior-varsity team. He moved on to Loyola High School in Los Angeles, where he coached the offensive line for head coach Mario DiMuro, and also taught classes in math, geometry, trigonometry and health sciences. In 1969, he applied for and was hired at a new college - California State Sonoma—now known as Sonoma State University—in the Santa Rosa/Rohnert Park, California area. It was one of 18 California state universities. He was hired as the head baseball coach and an assistant under head football coach Lloyd Helgeson. Sonoma State competed the junior varsity level in 1969. Peterson succeeded Helgeson as head coach in 1970 when Sonoma State moved up to varsity status, competing at the NCAA College Division level. He led Sonoma State to a record of 6–12–1 in two seasons, 1970 and 1971, before the school disbanded its football program in 1972. Peterson left Sonoma State in February 1973 to become an assistant football coach at UCLA under head coach Pepper Rodgers. When Dick Vermeil took over as head coach of the UCLA Bruins in 1974, he retained Peterson on his coaching staff that eventually led UCLA to a Rose Bowl upset over head coach Woody Hayes' No. 1-ranked Ohio State Buckeyes on January 1, 1976.

NFL coaching and administrative career
Peterson's impressive track record as a talent evaluator began during his days with the Philadelphia Eagles (1976–82.) New Eagles head coach Dick Vermeil took him along from UCLA, where in 1976, Peterson served as tight ends coach, special teams coach and administrative assistant. It was his ability to handle those myriad duties that led Vermeil to promote Peterson to a position in charge of player personnel with the Eagles in February 1977. With Peterson finding talent (despite a dearth of draft choices that had been traded away by previous Philadelphia administrations) and Vermeil's coaching, they lead the Eagles to four consecutive playoff seasons and Super Bowl XV. Among the football gems that Peterson uncovered deep in the NFL Draft were DE Carl Hairston (7th-round, played 224 games), RB Wilbert Montgomery (6th-round, played 107 games), NT Charlie Johnson (7th-round, 117 games), DE Dennis Harrison (4th-round, 136 games) and LB Reggie Wilkes (3rd round, 137 games.) Three of those five earned Pro Bowl honors during their career. When the Eagles finally re-gained selections in the first round, they grabbed in 1979 LB Jerry Robinson (184 games played), in 1980 CB Roynell Young (117 games) and in 1982 WR Mike Quick (101 games). All three of those players went on to Pro Bowl recognition.

USFL administrative career
In the spring of 1982, Peterson was contacted by the owners of a new team in Philadelphia scheduled to play in the United States Football League. After conversations with partners Myles Tannenbaum, Harold Schaeffer and Arthur Powell, he was convinced to join the new venture. In July 1982, Peterson was hired as president, general manager and part owner of the franchise that would eventually be named the Philadelphia Stars. When Peterson began his new job, the team did not have offices, other employees, a practice field or training facilities. He did however, have a head coach, as he was hired along with George Perles, then the defensive coordinator of the Pittsburgh Steelers. Peterson began the process of finding everything from offices, to players, to assistant coaches, to paper clips and a coffee-maker. The birth of the Stars was marred when Perles left in December 1982 to take the head coaching job at his alma mater, Michigan State University. With a first training camp just six weeks away, Peterson worked quickly to find a replacement, hiring New England Patriots defensive coordinator Jim Mora Sr., who he had worked with at UCLA under Vermeil. Together, they assembled the most successful team in the league's three-year existence, playing in all three USFL Championship Games, and capturing titles in 1984 and 1985. Their key players came from many different avenues: starting QB Chuck Fusina had failed in two chances in the NFL, while undersized middle linebacker Sam Mills was teaching high school photography after failing to stick in training camps in the NFL (Cleveland Browns) and Canadian Football League (Toronto Argonauts.) Through the USFL Drafts, Peterson added talented players like RB Kelvin Bryant from the University of North Carolina, OT Irv Eatman from UCLA and C Bart Oates from Brigham Young University in early rounds, and later finding CB Antonio Gibson from the University of Cincinnati and P Sean Landeta out of Towson State University. All were major contributors over three seasons in the playoffs.
The 1984 team was the most impressive, finishing 19–2 on the season and beating the Arizona Wranglers in the title game. But it was the '85 title team that was the most remarkable. The Stars became a commuting team, having been knocked out of their former home at Veterans Stadium in Philadelphia because of the USFL's plans—led by New Jersey Generals owner Donald Trump—to move from the spring to a fall schedule. That forced them to become the Baltimore Stars, playing that season at Byrd Stadium on the campus of the University of Maryland. Still, they were able to win the league championship, beating the Oakland Invaders, 28–24.
The Stars' 48–13–1 overall record during regular and postseason play, amassing a 7–1 postseason record, was the best of any USFL club. Due to that success,  Peterson's efforts were rewarded in 1983 and 1984, when he was named The Sporting News' USFL Executive of the Year. His players went on to great success in the NFL, as five Stars were named to 18 spots in the NFL Pro Bowl: Mills and Oates (5 times each), DL William Fuller (4), Landeta and LB Mike Johnson (2 each.) Mills was voted into the Pro Football Hall of Fame with the class of 2022. The Stars coaching staff produced four NFL head coaches: secondary coach Dom Capers (Carolina), defensive coordinator Vince Tobin (Arizona) and defensive assistant Vic Fangio (Denver) and head coach Jim Mora Sr. who went on to serve as head coach over 15 seasons for two different NFL teams: New Orleans Saints (1986–96) and Indianapolis Colts (1998-2001), finishing with a 125–106 record. Not only did Peterson have an eye for playing talent, he discovered scouts/talent evaluators for the Stars who would go on to become NFL general managers: Bill Kuharich (Saints), Rod Graves (Cardinals) and Terry Bradway (Jets.)
Peterson possessed the USFL championship trophy from the league's folding until 2018 when he donated the trophy to the Pro Football Hall of Fame.

After the USFL

Peterson continued to work on USFL matters until the dying league decided not to appeal the U.S. District Court anti-trust court case decision that led to a $3 payment to the league from the NFL for damaging its business standing. In the following year, he took over as chief executive officer of a magazine, PhillySport, that was dedicated to the sports scene in Philadelphia. Peterson also was sought after by NFL teams looking for a new general manager-personnel director-type, speaking with the New York Jets, St. Louis Cardinals, Dallas Cowboys and San Diego Chargers.  He was also part of a group led by Philadelphia Flyers and Spectrum owner Ed Snider that sought to purchase the financially troubled Dallas Cowboys and Texas Stadium. Snider wanted Peterson's expertise in evaluating and eventually running the football operation, agreeing to an equity stake in the process of buying the Cowboys.  Ultimately, the Philadelphia group was outbid for the team and stadium by a then little-known Arkansas oil man Jerry Jones.

Kansas City Chiefs

In November 1988, Peterson received a phone call from Chiefs owner Lamar Hunt, who wanted him to study his football team and operation. Peterson attended the Chiefs-Bengals game on November 13 of that season, but his presence was kept secret, as he watched the game from an empty luxury box. There were a series of conversations between Hunt and Peterson, where the owner heard that his organization was a fractured franchise and it was affecting the product on the field. After several face-to-face meetings in Chicago and Dallas, Hunt eventually offered Peterson the job running the franchise, and Peterson agreed but under one important proviso: he would be the sole person in charge of not only the football operation, but the business of the Kansas City Chiefs, answering only to Hunt. On December 18, 1988, Hunt announced Peterson would take over the team president duties from Jack Steadman and the general manager duties from Jim Schaaf.

Chiefs on the field (1989-98:)
Peterson faced a major rebuilding project with the Chiefs. In the previous 17 seasons (1972–88), the team had five different head coaches, eight different starting quarterbacks, only four winning seasons and one trip to the playoffs (1986.) It was after that '86 postseason that the team's front office inexplicably fired head coach John Mackovic. His path to respectability got a good jolt when Cleveland Browns owner Art Modell fired his head coach Marty Schottenheimer. In the previous four seasons, the Browns were 46–31, won three division titles and made the playoffs each season, including back-to-back appearances in the AFC Championship Game (1986-87.) Still, Modell wanted Schottenheimer to make changes to his coaching staff, and when he refused, they parted ways. One of the first people Schottenheimer called was Peterson, who on January 5, 1989, fired the Chiefs current head coach Frank Gansz. Although Schottenheimer drew attention from several other NFL teams (especially the San Diego Chargers), he was announced on January 24 as Kansas City's seventh head coach.
Not only did he obtain Schottenheimer, but the head coach brought seven of his Browns assistant coaches with him, including Bill Cowher (became KC defensive coordinator) and Joe Pendry (Chiefs offensive coordinator.) He also added defensive backs coach Tony Dungy and wide receivers coach Al Saunders.  All four of those coaches would become, or had already held head coaching jobs in pro football.  It was in the first months of that 1989 season that Peterson added another cornerstone to his rebuilding project: in the first round of the 1989 NFL Draft, he used the fourth selection to take LB Derrick Thomas from the University of Alabama. Over the next decade, Thomas became an icon in Kansas City for his play on the field (134 sacks in 179 regular and postseason games and nine Pro Bowls) and his work in the community; he received the NFL's Man of the Year Award in 1993. Thomas died from the aftereffects of an auto accident on February 8, 1999, and was just 31 years old.
Peterson found talent in all areas of the NFL Draft, including first round choices like Thomas (1989), CB Dale Carter (1992), S Jerome Woods (1996) and TE Tony Gonzalez (1997). He also found productive players in other rounds like: C Tim Grunhard (second in 1990), G Dave Szott (seventh in 1990), G Will Shields (third in 1993) and LB Donnie Edwards (fourth in 1996.) Thomas, Gonzalez and Shields are all members of the Pro Football Hall of Fame.
In those first ten seasons under Peterson's direction, the Chiefs posted an overall record of 104-65-1 (regular and postseason), with three division titles and seven appearances in the playoffs.

Chiefs on field (1999-2008)
After 10 seasons as head coach, Marty Schottenheimer resigned following the 1998 season, the only one in a decade where the Chiefs did not finish with a winning record. Peterson selected defensive coordinator Gunther Cunningham to be head coach, and over two seasons the Chiefs finished with a 16–16 record. In the early days of 2001, Peterson learned that his mentor and former boss Dick Vermeil was interested in returning to coaching. After winning the Super Bowl in the 1999 season with the St. Louis Rams, Vermeil had retired for a second time in his long coaching career. But the chance to work for Lamar Hunt and with Peterson convinced him to return to the league and he directed the team for five seasons (2001–05) and the team posted a 44–37 record, including a 13-3 division title year in 2003 that ended with a home loss in the AFC Divisional Playoffs to Indianapolis, 38–31. That game will forever be remembered as the afternoon neither team punted, as the offensives under Indy's Peyton Manning and KC's Trent Green dominated the action. It was offense that highlighted Vermeil's tenure with the Chiefs, as they were one of the highest producing attacks in the league, led by Green, tight end Gonzalez, RB Priest Holmes, WR Eddie Kennison and one of the top offensive lines in recent NFL history with LT Willie Roaf, LB Brian Waters, C Casey Wiegmann, RG Will Shields and RT John Tait/John Welbourn. In those five years, that group earned 11 combined trips to the Pro Bowl, and Roaf and Shields eventually joined the Pro Football Hall of Fame.
When Vermeil retired for the third—and final—time as an NFL head coach, Peterson reached for a familiar name as his replacement: Herm Edwards. The pair had known each other since the days when UCLA assistant coach Peterson tried to recruit California high school player Edwards to become a Bruin.  Later, Peterson signed Edwards as an undrafted free agent with the Eagles, where his long career helped lead him into coaching and scouting.  He worked for the Chiefs as a scout for two years, and was then hired in 1993 as the team's secondary coach. Edwards tenure started strong when the Chiefs went 9–7 in the 2006 season, earning a spot in the playoffs where they lost in an AFC Wild Card Game to Indianapolis, 23–8. With the team's roster aging, Edwards began a building project, working with player personnel director Bill Kuharich to get more young talent on the field. That made for tough times on the scoreboard, as the team went 4-12 (2007) and 2-14 (2008) in the next two seasons.
On December 15, 2008, Chiefs Chairman and Part-Owner Clark Hunt announced Peterson's resignation effective Jan. 15, 2009.

Overall Chiefs On Field (1989-2008:) In Peterson's 20 years with the Chiefs, they had only six losing seasons, a record of 176-143-1, nine playoff seasons, where they posted only a 3–9 record in the postseason, including just one AFC Championship appearance in 1993. Overall in those two decades there were 85 appearances by 30 different Chiefs players in the NFL Pro Bowl. Ten of those players were Peterson draft choices. Over 20 years, eight players who wore a Chiefs uniform under Peterson's direction were inducted into the Pro Football Hall of Fame. Besides the three Peterson draft choices that have been honored (Derrick Thomas in 2009, Will Shields in 2015 and Tony Gonzalez in 2019), center Mike Webster (1989-90) was inducted in 1997, QB Joe Montana (1993–94) in 2000, RB Marcus Allen (1993–97) in 2003, QB Warren Moon (1999-2000) in 2006 and LT Willie Roaf (2002–05) in 2012. The one statistic that most pleased Lamar Hunt was the Chiefs domination of their biggest rival - the Raiders - during the Peterson Era. In the 20 years (1969–88) before Peterson took over, the Chiefs posted a 13-25-2 record against the Raiders, a winning percentage of .350. In the 20 seasons (1989-2008) with Peterson, the Chiefs posted a 30–11 record in games against the Raiders, a .731 winning percentage.

Arrowhead Stadium and the Chiefs off-field success:
When Arrowhead Stadium opened in 1972, the Chiefs became the jewel franchise in the NFL. They were a recent Super Bowl winner, with a host of superstar players of that era and a sparkling new building, built just for football, where they controlled the parking, concessions and luxury boxes, paying only a small percentage of those revenues to the Jackson County Sports Authority. In that first Arrowhead season, the team announced attendance of 821,719 for an average crowd of 74,701 for 11 preseason and regular season games.
By the time Peterson took over the team 17 years, the Chiefs had become one of the least successful businesses in the NFL during the late 1970s and 1980s. They failed on the field, and they were failures off the field, having lost money for three straight seasons (1986-87-88) at a time when the average NFL team was operating at a profit. The team's attendance for the 1988 season was an average of 47,510 for each of the 10 home games.  So moribund had the franchise become that in both 1987 and 1988 the Kansas City NBC affiliate decided not to air its network's coverage of Chiefs road games to the West Coast, instead telecasting major league baseball playoff games, and the Kansas City Royals were not involved either game.

Peterson began digging out of the mess by commissioning marketing study of Kansas City sports fans, and what they didn't like and what they didn't want to see from their NFL team. On a number of occasions, Peterson said the reports indicated the fans wanted to retain only two elements of the franchise: Hall of Fame QB and radio broadcaster Len Dawson, and his partner on the broadcasts Bill Grigsby.
To help him turn around of the team's business, Peterson hired telecom executive Tim Connolly, who became the Executive Vice-president of Administration. They began making changes inside and outside Arrowhead Stadium. There was a new partnership with Ticketmaster to make access to buying seats easier, more security and attendants were added for game days, and the Chiefs improved handicap access. They also began promoting tailgating with the fans, as the Truman Sports Complex had 26,000 parking spots that could be used. They moved the team's radio broadcast rights to an FM-music channel, 101 the Fox, in hopes of reaching a younger demographic that wasn't buying tickets. It was only the second NFL team to have its games carried on FM, and the first on a rock and roll music station. Peterson began having his own radio show every week during the season, giving fans access to the decision maker, something they never had during the previous administration.
Peterson also reached out to Chiefs alumni who were no longer involved with the franchise, having been chased away by the previous administration. He formed the Chiefs Ambassadors, a group of former players who became involved in team functions, talking and helping current players, and also holding charitable events in the Kansas City community. The Ambassadors are still active and the idea has been copied by other NFL teams.

In 1988, the Chiefs reported 23,594 seats sold on a season ticket basis. That was out of a stadium capacity over 78,000. The team averaged 50,781 fans per regular season home game. With the off-field changes, and growing success on the field under Peterson's direction, slowly fans started returning to Arrowhead. By 1991, the season ticket sales reached 52,867 seats, with an average attendance at home games of 74,762. The tailgating atmosphere and the winning performance of the team turned Chiefs games into social events, with lavish parties in the parking lots before the game. Some fans began driving to the stadium without tickets, and sitting in the lots, watching the games on televisions they brought with them and enjoying the vibe and sound they could feel from inside the stadium. Game day at Arrowhead was the place to be, and the fan base grew across all demographic labels.
In 1991, the Chiefs sold out their home opener against Atlanta, and would continue to sellout games at Arrowhead for the next 18 seasons, a string of 149 consecutive sellouts. They led the NFL in attendance for six straight years (1994–99) and the AFC in paid attendance every year from 1992 through 2008. 
The Chiefs became a profitable and entertaining business, that developed a fan following that eventually saw season ticket holders in almost all 50 states. The rabid fan base has earned Arrowhead the distinction of being the loudest stadium in the NFL, and the game-day atmosphere is something any pro team, in any sport, can only hope to enjoy. That was all started and created by Peterson's work. He had one of the longest and most successful tenures for a team president, general manager and CEO in modern NFL history.

After the Chiefs
After stepping down from Kansas City on Jan. 15, 2009, Peterson did not walk away from the game of football that had been part of his life since the 1960s. He became involved in several different avenues of the game.

USA Football:In June 2009 at the request of NFL Commissioner Roger Goodell, Peterson became the Chairman of USA Football. Peterson's appointment by Goodell was met with the approval of NFL Players Association Executive Director DeMaurice Smith. He replaced the late AFL quarterback and U.S. Congressman Jack Kemp, in the role after Kemp's death. USA Football is the sport's national governing body in the United States, endowed by the NFL and NFL Players Association in 2002 through the NFL Youth Football Fund. USA Football strengthens America's favorite sport on youth and amateur levels through innovative resources to advance player safety and improve player, coach and youth league development. USA Football members — encompassing the high school and youth football community — reside in all 50 states and Washington, D.C. Peterson previously served on the NFL Youth Football Fund (YFF) Board of Directors, a 501(c)(3) non-profit foundation formed by the NFL and the NFLPA in 1998. The NFL Foundation committee was formed in 2013 to oversee much of the work previously established by the NFL YFF. The NFL Foundation committee supports the game at the youth level, promotes positive youth development and is committed to the health and safety of young players. Retired four-star Army Gen. Ray Odierno replaced Peterson as Chairman of USA Football in January 2017.

NFL League Office & Pro Football Hall of Fame:
Peterson was asked by Commissioner Roger Goodell to serve on several committees within the NFL, including a group that provided background information and recommendations on possible hires for general manager and head coaching positions.  He was also asked to serve as an adviser to the Pro Football Hall of Fame's selection committee that helped create a special class of inductees for the NFL's 100th anniversary. He was a non-voting advisor during discussions of the voting committee's deliberations while deciding on a candidate for the contributor category.

Stephen Ross & FanVision:In the last days of the United States Football League, New York real-estate executive Stephen Ross bought controlling interest in the Baltimore Stars. Ross hoped that the USFL's anti-trust lawsuit against the NFL would lead to the established league absorbing some USFL franchises. Baltimore seemed a good possibility, given that the city had just several years before lost the Colts to Indianapolis. Ross and Peterson worked together on USFL matters until the failed league gave up its legal fight.  Years later, after Peterson left the Chiefs, Ross asked him to serve as an advisor for his interests in the Miami Dolphins and a media company called FanVision. Ross purchased controlling interest in the Dolphins from former owner Wayne Huizenga in 2009, and part of that deal was FanVision, a handheld device that could service fans in stadiums, arenas and race tracks with live television, and other information streams. Peterson helped introduce Ross to many of the NFL movers and shakers in hopes of getting them to sign on for the service, which several teams did, as the company had 12 NFL teams and two universities as clients. Ross sold FanVision in 2018.

Philanthropy, activities and awards

Peterson serves on the National Board for the Maxwell Football Club and serves as chairman of the board of trustees for the Pop Warner Little Scholars organization. He is a member of the International World Presidents Organization (IWPO) and serves on the board of the Third and Long Foundation, founded by the late Pro Football Hall of Famer Derrick Thomas. Peterson was inducted into the Pennsylvania Sports Hall of Fame in 2009, into the Missouri Sports Hall of Fame in 2005 and into the Long Beach (CA) Sports Hall of Fame in 2003. Other honors he has received include: the 2002 Pop Warner Award for Excellence in Athletics, the 2001 Pro Football Executive Award (All-American Football Foundation), the '98 Maxwell Football Club Reds Bagnell Award for Outstanding Contributions to the Game of Football, and the '98 Special Achievement Award for Professional Athletics, presented by the Greater Kansas City Sports Commission. In 2012, Peterson won the Pete Rozelle Award presented by the Touchdown Club of New Orleans for his time as president, General Manager and CEO of the Kansas City Chiefs and chairman for USA Football. In 2016, Peterson received the Ellis Island Medal of Honor from the National Ethnic Coalition of Organizations, which pays homage to the immigrant experience and the contribution made to America by immigrants and their children. His father Eric arrived at Ellis Island from Sweden in 1917 as an eight-year old.

Personal
Peterson is married to the former Lori K. Larson of Scandia, Kansas, a graduate of the University of Kansas with a degree in architectural design. She worked in sports architectural design with Ellerbe Becket, HOK, Populous and Meis architects, rising to associate principal in the last three firms. They make their residence in the village of Loch Lloyd, Mo., and also on the MS The World, a private residential cruise ship.

Head coaching record

References

1943 births
Living people
Kansas City Chiefs executives
Philadelphia Eagles executives
Sonoma State Cossacks football coaches
National Football League general managers
National Football League team presidents
UCLA Bruins football coaches
High school football coaches in California
University of California, Los Angeles alumni
People from Long Beach, California
Coaches of American football from California